Long Farewell is a 2004 Russian drama film directed by Sergei Ursuliak based on the story of the same name by Yuri Trifonov.

Plot 
The film tells about a love triangle. Actress Lyalya loves her husband, an unsuccessful writer, and she is loved by an adult successful playwright who helped her solve all problems.

Cast 
 Polina Agureeva as Lyalya Telepniova
 Valentina Sharykina as Lyalya   in old
 Andrei Schchennikov as Grigory Rebrov
 Yevgeny Kindinov as Grigory  in old
 Boris Kamorzin as Nikolai Smolyanov, playwright
 Tatyana Lebedkova as Irina Ignatievna
 Pyotr Merkuryev as Boris Mironovich Marevin
 Konstantin Zheldin	as 	Pyotr Alexandrovich, Lyalya's father
 Alexander Klyukvin as Smurny 
 Genrietta Yegorova as Tamara Ignatievna
 Lyudmila Arinina as episode
 Anna Antonenko-Lukonina  as Anna Vasilievna
 Galina Konovalova as theater actress
 Valeriy Troshin as Kotov
 Fyodor Dobronravov as Fyodor Vasilyevich
 Valery Zhakov as episode
 Evgeniya Dmitrieva as Allochka

References

External links 
 

2004 films
2000s Russian-language films
Russian drama films
2004 drama films
Films about theatre
Films based on Russian novels